Tamil Nadu Grama Bank (TNGB) is a regional rural bank headquartered at Salem in Tamil Nadu, India. The bank is jointly owned by the central and state governments and sponsored by the Indian Bank. It is under the ownership of the Ministry of Finance, Government of India.

Tamil Nadu Grama Bank was formed on 1 April 2019 by the amalgamation of the erstwhile Pallavan Grama Bank and Pandyan Grama Bank, as per GOI Gazette Notification No. 363 dated 28 January 2019.

Share Capital 
The paid-up capital is Rs. 46.96 crores, shared by the shareholders as below:

 Government of India (50%): Rs. 23 crores and 48 lakhs
 Government of Tamil Nadu (15%): Rs. 7 crores and 4 lakhs
 Indian Bank (35%): Rs. 16 crores and 44 lakhs

References

External links
 

Regional rural banks of India
2018 establishments in Tamil Nadu
Indian companies established in 1977
Banks established in 1977
Banks of India